Silver Tongue Devil is the third solo studio album by Canadian rapper Madchild. It was released on July 24, 2015 through Battle Axe Records. Recording sessions took place at the Chamber Studios in Nanaimo, British Columbia. Production was handled by C-Lance, Aspect, Rob The Viking, Evidence and The Makerz. It features guest appearances from Young De, Slaine, CeeKay Jones and JD Era. The album peaked at number three on the Canadian Albums Chart.

Track listing

Personnel
Shane "Madchild" Bunting – main artist, executive producer
Joseph "JD Era" Dako – featured artist (track 4)
Ceekay Jones – featured artist (track 6)
Demerick "Young De" Ferm – featured artist (tracks: 7, 10, 14)
George "Slaine" Carroll – featured artist (tracks: 10, 13)
Craig "C-Lance" Lanciani – producer (tracks: 1, 2, 4, 5, 7, 8, 10, 14)
Michael "Evidence" Perretta – producer (track 3), photography
The Makerz – producers (track 6)
Aspect – producer (tracks: 9, 11, 15, 17)
Robin "Rob the Viking" Hooper – producer (tracks: 12, 13), arranger, co-producer, mixing
Tom Baker – mastering
Ivory Daniel – executive producer
Kevin Zinger – executive producer
Lamour Supreme – artwork

Charts

References

External links 

2015 albums
Madchild albums
Albums produced by Evidence (musician)